Cape Skopia ( - Ákra Skopiá, meaning "cape lookout"; anciently  - Krithotí, ; also formerly Turkovekla and Tourkovígla) is a headland in Acarnania forming the northern arm of land enclosing the Bay of Astakos. It is southwest of Astakos. It was one of the few natural features of Acarnania that is mentioned in the writings of antiquity, along with the more famous cape of Actium.

References

Landforms of Aetolia-Acarnania
Acarnania